Jibril Othman (born 26 April 2004) is a footballer who plays as a striker for  club Saint-Étienne. Born in France, he represents Tunisia at youth international level.

Club career
Othman joined the youth academy of Saint-Étienne in 2012. With 16 goals from 23 matches, he was his team's top scorer in 2021–22 Championnat National U19 season. He made his senior team debut on 15 October 2022 as a 72nd minute substitute for Yvann Maçon in a 2–0 league defeat against Paris FC.

International career
Othman is a former French youth international. In March 2020, he received his first call-up from France under-16 team for friendly matches against Luxembourg. However, those matches were called off later due to COVID-19 pandemic in France. In January 2021, he was called up to the France under-17 team to take part in a four-day internship and play unofficial matches against youth teams of Rennes and Guingamp.

On 19 September 2022, Tunisian Football Federation announced that Othman have chosen to represent Tunisia in international football. He made his debut for Tunisia under-20 team two days later on 21 September in a goalless draw against France.

Personal life
Born in France, Othman is of Tunisian descent.

Career statistics

References

External links
 
 

2004 births
Living people
Footballers from Saint-Étienne
Tunisian footballers
Tunisia youth international footballers
French footballers
French sportspeople of Tunisian descent
Association football forwards
Ligue 2 players
Championnat National 3 players
AS Saint-Étienne players